The Tour du Jura is a road bicycle race held annually in France. It was organized as a 2.2 event on the UCI Europe Tour until 2021 when it became a one-day race and upgraded to 1.1 status.

Winners

References

UCI Europe Tour races
Cycle races in France
2003 establishments in France
Recurring sporting events established in 2003